Rocket Arena (RA) is a free modification (mod) for the multiplayer first-person shooter games Quake, Quake II, Quake III Arena and Quake 4. There are also ports for Half-Life (called Lambda Arena) and Unreal Tournament. Rocket Arena was created by David "crt" Wright of GameSpy and first released for Quake in 1997, less than a year after Quake'''s debut. It became a successful and influential user-created game modification.

 Gameplay Rocket Arena is very similar to standard deathmatch, in that players battle against each other for survival. The major differences are that the players all start with identical resources — weapons, ammunition, health, and armor — and that all resources are removed from the map, thus preventing players from improving their condition. These two conditions focus the gameplay towards fighting and away from more traditional deathmatch techniques that involve resource domination.

Each Rocket Arena game contains one or more rounds. Each round begins by spawning players randomly throughout the map, or arena. Once a player is "fragged" (destroyed), he or she is removed from play, and allowed to spectate. When one team has no more players in the arena, the other team wins the round and the next round begins. The team that wins the most rounds, wins the game. Games are played continuously.

 Standard Rocket Arena mode 
Every player creates a team or joins a team depending on the set number of players allowed per team. A queue is formed and the first two teams play a game (which may include several rounds). The winning team stays at the top of the queue and fights the next team, while the losing team is placed at the end of the queue.

 Clan Arena mode 
Every player joins either the Red team or the Blue team, and these two teams play games continuously. Every player gets to play every round, and since there are no other teams, there is no waiting in a queue to play. Clan Arena became popular because players start off with all their weapons and are not able to hurt themselves or their team.

 Red Rover mode 
Every player joins either the Red team or the Blue team, and these two teams play one match continuously. In this mode, when a player is fragged, they immediately respawn as a member of the opposing team. This allows for continuous play, instead of having to wait for the next round. The game ends when one team no longer has any players. A player receives one point for fragging another player and loses one point for dying. Whichever player has the most points at the end of the round wins that particular match.

 Practice mode 
There are no teams. Every player is invincible and has infinite ammunition. As the name implies, it is for practicing. Often used to learn the intricacies of the maps.

 Popularity Rocket Arena aims to correct some of the weaknesses many perceive with conventional deathmatch. In particular, in deathmatch, slain players are reincarnated in a relatively weak condition, and often face opponents that have gathered better resources. This can lead to conditions where a few players can dominate a game, hoarding all of the game's resources and repeatedly kill their perpetually disadvantaged opponents without ever dying themselves. Such domination isn't always a good reflection of the dominant player's fighting skills, but instead it frequently reflects their map prowess and resource gathering skills.Rocket Arena aims to level the playing field by giving reincarnated players full health, weapons, and armour. No further pickups are available, so each player's condition monotonically decreases through the game, until they are killed and reborn.

Clan Arena proved so popular that it is now a standard game mode in the 2009 Quake release, Quake Live.

Clan Arena is one of the 6 modes featured in Doom 2016.

 Critical reaction Rocket Arena 3, the version of the mod for Quake 3 was given the PC Zone award for excellence and received a score of 89%.  Dave Woods described it as "even faster and reliant on reflexes and quick thinking [than Quake 3].  Top stuff indeed."  The publication also scored Rocket Arena: UT (for Unreal Tournament) 4 out of 5, praising its fast and furious gameplay and the quality of the maps.  It did not however, rate the UT version as highly as Rocket Arena 3''.

References

External links 
 

1997 video games
First-person shooters
Quake mods
Quake II mods
Quake III Arena mods
Quake 4 mods
Multiplayer online games